Amando Maglalang Tetangco Jr. (born November 14, 1952) is a Filipino banker, who served as the third Governor of the Bangko Sentral ng Pilipinas (BSP).  He was the first BSP governor to serve two terms,  having been first appointed to the office by Philippine president Gloria Macapagal Arroyo in July 4 2005, and reappointed in July 31, 2011 by President Benigno Aquino III to serve another six-year term.

Early life and education
Born on November 14, 1952  to Amando, Sr. and the former Teodora Maglalang, Tetangco finished elementary and high school at the Don Bosco Academy in Pampanga. He went on to pursue his AB Economics degree at the Ateneo de Manila University, where he graduated cum laude; he also took up graduate courses in business administration in the same institution. Later on, as a scholar of the then Central Bank of the Philippines, Tetangco completed his MA in Public Policy and Administration (concentration in Development Economics) at the University of Wisconsin in Madison, United States.

Career
Before joining the BSP in 1974, Tetangco was connected to the management services division of the accounting firm Sycip Gorres Velayo & Co.

A career central banker, he has occupied different positions in the organization in a span of over three decades. Immediately prior to his appointment as BSP Governor, he was Deputy Governor in-charge of the Banking Services Sector, Economic Research and Treasury.

As BSP Governor in 2005, Tetangco is concurrently the Chairman of the BSP Monetary Board, the Anti-Money Laundering Council, and Philippine International Convention Center; Vice-Chairman of the Agriculture Credit Policy Council; member of the Capital Market Development Council, Export Development Council, PhilExport Board of Trustees, Philippine Export-Import Credit Agency; and director of the Philippine Deposit Insurance Corporation, National Development Council, and National Home Mortgage Finance Corporation.

He also represents the country in various international and regional organizations, including the Executive Meeting of East Asia and Pacific Central Banks; ASEAN and ASEAN+3; South East Asia Central Banks; South East Asia, New Zealand and Australia; Center for Latin American Monetary Studies; and Asia-Pacific Economic Cooperation. He is the governor for the Philippines in the International Monetary Fund, and the Alternate Governor in the World Bank and in the Asian Development Bank.

Personal life
Tetangco is married to Elvira Ma. Plana, with whom he has three children: a son and two daughters. He is an avid shooter and golfer.

Honors and awards
In January 2013, Tetangco has been named Central Banker of the Year for Asia-Pacific by The Banker.

Before this, he was honored in October 2012 by the financial magazine Emerging Markets as the Central Bank Governor of the Year for Asia.

In the same year, he was named as one of the world's six best central bankers for 2012 by the Global Finance magazine, an accolade that had been previously given to him in 2006, 2007 and 2011.

References 

1952 births
Living people
Ateneo de Manila University alumni
Governors of the Bangko Sentral ng Pilipinas
Benigno Aquino III administration personnel
Arroyo administration personnel
Duterte administration personnel